Peppercanister Press was a small press in Dublin founded by Thomas Kinsella to publish his own poetry. In later years, the series began to be published by Dedalus Press.

Publications

First series
 Peppercanister 1, Butcher's Dozen (1972)
 printed shortly after the Widgery Tribunal
 Peppercanister 2, A Selected Life (1972) 
 in memoriam Seán Ó Riada
 Peppercanister 3, Vertical Man (1973)
 a sequel to Peppercanister 2
 Peppercanister 4, The Good Fight (1973)
 noting the anniversary of John F. Kennedy assassination
The first series was collected into the book Fifteen Dead (Dolmen/Oxford, 1979)

Second series
 Peppercanister 5, One (1974)
 continuing themes from his book Notes from the Land of the Dead; includes illustrations by Anne Yeats
 Peppercanister 6, A Technical Supplement (1976)
 includes details of illustrations from Diderot's Encyclopédie
 Peppercanister 7, Song of the Night and Other Poems (1976)
The second series was collected into the book One and Other Poems (Dolmen/Oxford, 1979)
The first and second series were collected into the book Peppercanister Poems 1972-1978 (Wake Forest University Press, 1979)

Third series
 Peppercanister 8, The Messenger (1985)
 Peppercanister 9, Songs of the Psyche (1985)
 Peppercanister 10, Her Vertical Smile (1985)
 These three were published simultaneously.
 Peppercanister 11, Out of Ireland
 Peppercanister 12, St. Catherine's Clock
 These two were later collected as Blood and Family (Oxford University Press, 1988)

Later publications

 Peppercanister 13, 
 Peppercanister 14, 
 Peppercanister 15, 
 Peppercanister 16, "Madonna" and Other Poems (1995)
 Peppercanister 17, "Open Court" (1991)
 Peppercanister 18, The Pen Shop
 Peppercanister 19, 
 Peppercanister 20, The Familiar (1999)
 Peppercanister 21, Godhead (1999)
 Peppercanister 22, Citizen of the World
 Peppercanister 23, Littlebody
 Peppercanister 24, Marginal Economy
 Peppercanister 25, Readings in Poetry
Kinsella discusses works by William Shakespeare, W. B. Yeats and T. S. Eliot
 Peppercanister 26, Man of War
 Peppercanister 27, Belief and Unbelief (2007)
 Peppercanister 28, Fat Master (2011)
 Peppercanister 29, Love Joy Peace (2011)
24, 26-29 collected as Late Poems (Carcanet Press, 2013)

Other collections
Thomas Kinsella: The Peppercanister Poems (University College Dublin Press, 2001)

References

Publishing companies of Ireland